XEFR-AM is a radio station in Mexico City. Located on 1180 kHz, XEFR-AM is owned by Grupo ACIR and broadcasts an oldies format known as Radio Felicidad.

History
Radio Felicidad received its concession in 1952 and came to air in 1963.

In the 1990s, the station became rock-formatted Óxido 1180. That format was discontinued in 1998 in favor of sports talk as Superdeportivo 1180; it lasted just months, before Grupo ACIR decided to flip the station to its regional Mexican La Comadre format (which returned to Mexico City in 2015 on XEL-AM 1260). This, too, did not last long, before the Radio Felicidad name and format, which had been associated with the station in its early days, was restored.

XEFR is the official radio station of the Diablos Rojos del México baseball team and carries their games.

References

External links
iheart Mexico City website

Radio stations established in 1963
Radio stations in Mexico City
Grupo ACIR